La Caleta (La Caleta municipal district) is a small community located in the Santo Domingo Province of the Dominican Republic. La Caleta obtained its name from its origins as a small cove. It was elevated to Municipal District by Law 107-04, dated 16 July 2004, in the municipality of Boca Chica.

La Caleta is bordered on the south by the Caribbean Sea, on the north by the municipality of San Antonio de Guerra, on the west by the municipality of Santo Domingo Este, and on the east by the municipality of Boca Chica. It consists of Brave, Campo Lindo, Tower B and 22 neighborhoods in development. Its first trustee was Máximo Soriano and Juan Alba, a cousin to María de los Ángeles Trujillo Martínez y Alba and cousin-in-law to Rafael Trujillo. La Caleta has a population over 58,000.

The area hosts sports clubs, organizations, schools, colleges, clinics, and supermarkets, among others.

The Technological Institute The Americas (ITLA), The La Caleta Underwater National Park, a golf course (San Andres), a softball and baseball stadium, a hotel (Quality), an industrial park zone (the Americas), as well as a small beach are there.

Economy 

Fishing, trade, semi-tourism, transport unions are local occupations.

History 

La Caleta was founded in 1952 and consisted of about 90 houses covered with lime and sand, without a preconceived development plan. Settlers came from many places, including Ibarra, Carvajal, Mosque, Los Castros, Lopez, Perez and Cedeño.

The first settlements in the area were pre-Columbian and belonged to the chieftainship of Higuey.

Between 1955 and 1956, construction began on what is now the Las Americas International Airport, located on the peninsula of Punta Caucedo. The construction led residents to move north, where the town now stands. In 1960 a small number of people who still lived in the south were evicted to complete construction of the International Airport of Las Americas.

In 1972, a second eviction removed settlers who lived south of Las Americas to make way for excavations. They found the remains of an indigenous settlement in the area. In 1974 the Archaeological Park La Caleta was completed.

Sections

References 

Populated places in Santo Domingo Province
Populated places established in 1952
1952 establishments in the Dominican Republic